The Altamira yellowthroat (Geothlypis flavovelata) is a New World warbler. It is a resident breeding bird endemic to the Gulf slope of northeastern Mexico.

It is closely related to common yellowthroat, Belding's yellowthroat, and Bahama yellowthroat, with which it forms a superspecies. It has been considered conspecific with these species.

The adult male has a black face mask and yellow crown. Females are similar, but lack the black mask and have an olive crown. This species is easily distinguished from wintering common yellowthroats by its uniform yellow underparts, in contrast to common's white belly. Males' yellow forehead bands are diagnostic.

Vocalizations are very similar to those of common yellowthroat and are not readily distinguishable to the human ear. Altamira and common yellowthroats, however, do not respond to tapes of one another's songs.

The species is resident in freshwater marshes (including canals and drainage ditches),  especially those with cattails.  Little is known of its breeding or feeding habits, but other yellowthroats build a cup nest low in vegetation and feed on insects, usually captured in dense vegetation, so it is likely that the Altamira yellowthroat does the same. There has been a decline in numbers of this localized bird due to loss of habitat.

References

External links
BirdLife Species Factsheet.

Altamira yellowthroat
Birds of Mexico
Endemic birds of Mexico
Altamira yellowthroat
Taxa named by Robert Ridgway
Veracruz moist forests